Ngalia, Ngaliya or Ngalea may refer to:

 Ngalia (Western Desert), an Aboriginal people of the Western Desert in Western Australia and South Australia
 Ngalia (Ngalea or Ooldean), a dialect of the Western Desert language
 Ngalia (Northern Territory), an Aboriginal Australian people of the Northern Territory
 Ngaliya, a dialect of the Warlpiri language
 Ngalia Basin, a sedimentary basin in central Australia

See also
 Mantjintjarra Ngalia, a union of the Western Desert Ngalia and Mantjintjarra